Kang Min Kyung Vol. 1 is the debut extended play of Kang Min-kyung, one half of South Korean duo Davichi. It was released on February 27, 2019.

The album is Kang Min-kyung's first solo debut after 11 years as a Davichi member. She participated in writing, composing and producing all tracks on this album.

Release
On February 1, 2019, Kang Min-kyung's agency confirmed that she would release her first solo extended play on February 27.

On February 23, 2019, Kang released the first music video teaser for "Because I Love You".

On February 26, 2019, just 1 day prior to the album releasing, Kang released the second music video teaser for "Because I Love You".

Track listing

Charts and certifications

Albums chart

Sales and certifications

Release history

References

External links
 

Davichi albums
2019 debut EPs
Korean-language EPs
Stone Music Entertainment EPs